Abberley is a village and civil parish in Worcestershire, England.

Abberley may also refer to:

People
 Neal Abberley (1944–2011), an English cricketer
 Paul Abberley (born 1959), chief executive of Charles Stanley Group

Other uses
 Abberley Clock Tower, a clock tower in Abberley, Worcestershire
 Abberley Hall School, a boarding school in Abberley, Worcestershire, England
 Abberley Hall, a country house in Worcestershire, England